Panagal may refer to

 Panagal, Nalgonda district
 Panagal, Mahbubnagar district